Mallory Mill is a historic grist mill located at Hammondsport in Steuben County, New York. It was built about 1836 and is four story, gambrel roofed stone industrial building.  In the 1880s, it was converted for use as a winery.

It was listed on the National Register of Historic Places in 1999.

References

Grinding mills on the National Register of Historic Places in New York (state)
Industrial buildings completed in 1836
Buildings and structures in Steuben County, New York
Grinding mills in New York (state)
National Register of Historic Places in Steuben County, New York
1836 establishments in New York (state)